The slippery dick (Halichoeres bivittatus) is a species of wrasse native to shallow, tropical waters of the western Atlantic Ocean.

Description
The slippery dick wrasse is a small fish that can reach a maximum length of 35 cm.
It has a thin, elongate body with a terminal mouth, and its body coloration has three phases during its life:
 The terminal phase is when the fish becomes a male, so the body coloration turns to green with two longitudinal dark stripes. The head and tail are covered with pink lines; it has a small black dot up to the pectoral fin. 
 The initial phase is when the juvenile becomes a female. The background body coloration is mainly whitish with pink shade, and the sides have two dark longitudinal stripes. The median one is usually black extending from the snout and via the eye to the base of the tail. The second one is a paler lateral stripe further below. The upper stripe incorporates a bicolored (green and yellow turning later to black) spot where it crosses the edge of the gills (this is present in all phases).  Intermediates vary greatly, from shades of light purple to dark brown. Juveniles are usually white and have two dark stripes, but the lower (abdominal) stripe may be faint. 
 The juvenile phase. The body is usually whitish, still with the two longitudinal stripes and the spot up to the pectoral fin, as in the initial phase.

Distribution and habitat
The slippery dick wrasse is widespread throughout the tropical and subtropical waters of the western Atlantic Ocean. It can be found from North Carolina and Bermuda to Brazil, including the Gulf of Mexico and the Caribbean Sea area.

Biology
This species feeds on benthic invertebrates, including crabs, small fishes, sea urchins and ophiuroids, polychaetes, and gastropods.

It is a protogynous hermaphrodite. These fish form leks while breeding. In North Carolina, males defend temporary territories with peak spawning in May and June. Pair spawning typically occurs between females and terminal phase males; initial phase males occasionally try to insert themselves into the spawning event.

Status and threats
This species is widespread and very common throughout much of its range in the Caribbean and Florida, although it is uncommon in northeastern Brazil. There are no major threats known to this species, and population trends are unknown. It is listed as Least Concern (LC) by the IUCN.

References

External links

Caribbean Diving Guide
Marine Species
Fish Base
EOL.org
 

Slippery dick
Fish of the Atlantic Ocean
Taxa named by Marcus Elieser Bloch
Fish described in 1791